Dave Lee may refer to:

 Dave Lee (basketball) (born 1942), American basketball player
 Dave Lee (chaos magician), British writer and chaos magician
 Dave Lee (comedian) (1947–2012), British comedian 
 Dave Lee (darts player) (born 1956), English former darts player
 Dave Lee (DJ) (born 1964), British DJ, producer, and remixer often better known as Joey Negro
 Dave Lee (horn player), British horn and Wagner tuba player associated with the Michael Nyman Band
 Dave Lee (jazz musician) (born 1926), jazz pianist and orchestra leader

See also 
 David Lee (disambiguation)